Ed, Edd n Eddy: The Mis-Edventures is a 3D platform video game based on the Cartoon Network animated television series Ed, Edd n Eddy, developed by Artificial Mind and Movement and Cartoon Network Interactive and published by Midway Games. The game's plot is loosely structured around six different stories with two bonus levels, each involving a scam by the titular trio to acquire enough money to buy jawbreakers, a plot that mirrors that of the animated series. Players may choose at any point to take control of Ed, Edd, or Eddy to overcome the game's obstacles. Character selection is strategical due to each of the Eds having his own unique ability. Throughout the game, the player encounters not only the Ed trio but also the series' side characters, such as Jimmy, Sarah, Kevin, Jonny, and the Kanker sisters.

It was announced on February 15, 2005, and released on October 31, 2005, for the PlayStation 2, GameCube, Xbox, Game Boy Advance, and Microsoft Windows. It is the second video game based on Ed, Edd n Eddy, succeeding Ed, Edd n Eddy: Jawbreakers! and preceding Ed, Edd n Eddy: Scam of the Century.

Gameplay

Ed, Edd n Eddy: The Mis-Edventures is a 3D platforming game in which protagonists Ed, Edd, and Eddy are playable characters. Players can use them in special tag team formations like the "(Leaning-)Tower-of-Eddy" (as Eddy), "Trampol-Edd" (as Edd), and "Batter-Ed(-Ram)" (as Ed) to complete eight levels, referred to as scams. The Eds' normal weapons and skills include Ed lifting heavy objects and smashing his head, Edd using a slingshot to hit distant targets and smacking with his ruler in close range, and Eddy using the El Mongo stink bomb to stun enemies, along with using his wallet attached to a chain like a yo-yo.

Plot
The game is divided into six segments, each having its own separate plot. The two bonus stages are only available in the console and Windows versions of the game.

Cool Yer Ed 
In "Cool Yer Ed", the Eds plan to steal ice cubes from coolers in the neighborhood kids' backyards to create snow-cones to sell during the hot weather. Though they face obstacles, Ed's unquestioned strength and speed guides them through. They find a meatball-making machine in Rolf's shed, but Rolf refuses to let them use it. His pigs escape after Ed smashes the fence of their pen, and the Eds agree to catch the pigs if Rolf lets them borrow the machine. Rolf agrees, and the Eds capture the pigs in the pen. The Eds finally make snow cones by covering the meatballs in ice, which Ed begins to eat.

Pin the Tail on the Ed 
In "Pin the Tail on the Ed", Jimmy has a birthday party, but Rolf tells the Eds not to come. The Eds find their own way to the party, and Ed suggests that they sneak in through the sewers. Despite Edd's worries, Eddy leads his friends through the sewer to crash Jimmy's party and are successful. While everyone is inside Jimmy's house, the Eds break Jimmy's pinatas, but the Kankers pop out of one and chase them. Edd uses his slingshot to shoot down beehives, which makes the bees chase the Kankers away. But at that moment, Kevin tells the Eds that the party has ended. Jimmy "rewards" them with a blob of icing with five birthday candles in it, which Ed proceeds to eat.

Must Be Something I Ed 
In "Must Be Something I Ed", Rolf informs the Eds of the candy store's "Customer Appreciation Day", in which employees give out free jawbreakers. Because closing time is nearing, Eddy takes a shortcut, which passes Sarah and Jimmy, Kevin, Johnny, and Plank, and a vicious bulldog. After arriving at the candy store, Eddy suffers an allergic reaction to a tainted jawbreaker that turns his face green. The trio sneaks back to Eddy's house unseen, but as Eddy draws the curtains, the kids appear and laugh while photographing Eddy's face.

Ed on Arrival 
In "Ed on Arrival", Rolf boasts about his Urban Ranger badge to the Eds, and Eddy says he wants one. Rolf challenges the Eds to cross the Peach Creek Estates construction site, where he has set up an assault course, promising them the badge if they cross it. Eddy refuses at first, but when Rolf says the badge will go to Kevin instead, Eddy accepts his challenge. Rolf privately tells Kevin to ensure the Eds do not succeed. Despite Kevin's tricks, traps, and tribulations, the Eds complete Rolf's tasks. After a head-butting competition with Rolf's goat, Victor, the Eds race Kevin for the badge. The Eds win, but for the badge to be shared fairly, Rolf rips the badge into three pieces. Ed wants to trade his piece with Eddy's, but Eddy is so annoyed that he shoves it up Ed's nose and storms off.

Nightmare on Ed Street 
In "Nightmare on Ed Street", Jimmy's toy rabbit, Mr. Yum Yum, is trapped on the window sill of an abandoned house. When Eddy promises to retrieve it for a quarter, Jimmy refuses, saying he will pay him when he gets Mr. Yum Yum back. Inside the house, Eddy reveals that he told Ed to steal Jimmy's rabbit so Jimmy would pay to have it returned, but Ed tells Eddy that he put Mr. Yum Yum on the mantel, not the window sill. Suddenly, the Kanker sisters appear, holding Mr. Yum Yum and threatening to cut it with a spinning saw. After the Kankers make flirtatious advances towards the Eds, they agree to trade Mr. Yum Yum with the Eds in exchange for giving them "good boyfriend presents" without any kisses. After exploring around the abandoned house, the Eds bring the Kankers their presents (a ship in a bottle for Lee, a can of axle grease for Marie, and a taxidermy book for May) and disable the saw. They successfully retrieve Mr. Yum Yum for Jimmy, only for it to fall in half. Jimmy runs off sobbing over the loss of his toy, leaving the Eds without their promised reward.

Ed Marks the Spot 
In "Ed Marks the Spot", Eddy plans to share his secret stash of jawbreakers in his suitcase with Ed and Edd, but someone has taken them all. As Eddy shakes the suitcase, a piece of a map falls out. Edd suggests that they search for other map pieces to recover Eddy's missing jawbreakers. The Eds collaborate to discover the jawbreaker thief and confront him/her. They collect the first piece from Johnny (who tried to get it from a fence and turn it into a paper airplane), the second piece from Jimmy (who tried doing origami with it), and the last piece from Rolf's goat, Victor, by head-butting him off a cliff. After putting the pieces together, they realize the Kankers took the jawbreakers. When Eddy angrily storms into their trailer, the Eds accidentally activate a trap door and fall underground. They run away from the Kankers, who are madly trying to kiss them. They enter a room where they battle the Kankers to get the jawbreakers back. After defeating them, the Eds grab the jawbreakers and run back to the Kankers' trailer, which has been decorated to look like a church. They realize that the Kankers have trapped them in a wedding ceremony, as they kiss the frightened Eds.

Bonus levels
In "Revenge of Ed-zilla", Eddy recreates his Edtropolis scam. All is well until Ed believes he is a monster and rampages throughout the city. He battles the Kankerator at the Chunky Puffs factory, using giant Chunky Puffs as his weapon against them. After Ed defeats the Kankers (destroying Edtropolis in the process), Eddy angrily whacks Ed in the face with a metal dustpan lid.

In "Robot Rebel Ranch", the Eds are stuck on a robot planet, and their only hope is to get to the space rocket. Ed thinks he should take the lead, but he gets zapped by robot rebels and taken capture. Edd (using Ed's laser pistol and a red lightsaber) and Eddy (using a shock bomb and yellow plasma flail) try to rescue Ed from the robot rebels. After freeing Ed, they must find the space rocket before leaving the planet. They battle the giant robot leader: a huge, red robot turret with a cowboy hat and two laser cannons. Edd helps them complete their mission and find the rocket. Their imaginary game is disrupted when Sarah yells at Ed to come home for dinner as the game ends with Ed crossly storming away.

Promotion
In order to promote the game, Cartoon Network and Midway released The Ed-ventures interactive flash game on the now defunct midwaycartoon.com. The game allows viewers to visit the bedrooms of the three main characters, interacting with clickable objects yields several goodies such as videos and pictures of the game, character biographies and quizzes. Collecting the nine jawbreakers (three in each room) allows players to download hints and tips for the game.

Reception

Ed, Edd n Eddy: The Mis-Edventures received generally mixed reviews from critics. IGN's Charles Onyett criticized the game for its "unclear" objectives, repetitive voice acting, and short length, but he praised the game's graphics for "reproduce[ing] the visual style of the show quite accurately...to an often hilarious degree." Chad of WorthPlaying.com stated, "The Mis-Edventures honestly surprised me. I went in expecting the same kind of quick cash-in, licensed schlock that publishers throw at consumers to add to their bottom line, but the game really is fun to play and remains extremely faithful to the show. Needless to say, if you don't care too much for the show, The Mis-Edventures isn't going to sway you and it is way too short, but if you have a younger sibling, kids, or are yourself a younger gamer, The Mis-Edventures may be right up your cul-de-sac."

References

External links
  
 

2005 video games
Game Boy Advance games
GameCube games
PlayStation 2 games
Xbox games
Windows games
Video games based on Ed, Edd n Eddy
Video games developed in Canada
Video games with cel-shaded animation
Behaviour Interactive games
3D platform games
Adventure games
Single-player video games
Video games using Havok
Cartoon Network video games